The Swedish comital family Adlercreutz is a part of the baronial family Adlercreutz. The general of the Swedish cavalry, cabinet minister and adjutant general Carl Johan Adlercreutz (1757-1815), who had been created a Swedish baron 30 August 1808, was created Swedish count in accordance with the 37th paragraph of the Swedish instrument of government of 1809, meaning only the head of the family possesses the title, 31 August 1814 in Uddevalla by King Charles XIII of Sweden, and was introduced at the Swedish house of the nobility 10 March 1814 as comital family number 125.

The present count is Carl Fredrik Magnus Adlercreutz, born 25 October 1944, who inherited the title from his father, count Gustaf Fredrik Adlercreutz, at his death in 1973. His son Magnus Gustaf Victor Adlercreutz is the present baron Adlercreutz.

Adlercreutz no 125

Carl Adlercreutz (1698–1750), Swedish field secretary
Tomas Adlercreutz (1733–1796), Swedish officer
Carl Johan Adlercreutz (1757–1815), Swedish officer
Fredrik Tomas Adlercreutz (1793–1852), Swedish officer and diplomat in Colombia
Nikolas Adlercreutz (1832–1909), Swedish officer and landowner 
Nils Adlercreutz (1866–1955), Swedish officer and horse rider
Gregor Adlercreutz (1898–1944), Swedish dressage rider
Carlos Adlercreutz (1828–1903), Swedish chamberlain
Carl Adlercreutz (1853–1904), Swedish count and officer
Carlos Adlercreutz (1890–1963), Swedish officer
Thomas Adlercreutz (born 1944), Swedish jurist
Gustaf Adlercreutz (born 1946)
Gustaf Magnus Adlercreutz (1775–1845) Swedish lieutenant general
Axel Adlercreutz (1821–1880), Swedish politician and government official
Carl Adlercreutz (1866–1937), Swedish doctor
Axel Adlercreutz (1917–2013), Swedish professor of law
Magnus Adlercreutz (1868–1923), Swedish officer
Patrick Adlercreutz (1871–1955), Swedish diplomat

Adlercreutz no 1386

Tomas (né Teuterström) Adlercreutz (1643–1710) Swedish nursar
Erik Adlercreutz (1694–1741) Swedish hovrättsråd
Henrik Tomas Adlercreutz (1732–1801), Swedish assessor
Carl Henrik Adlercreutz (1772–1832), Finnish lawspeaker
Herman Leonard Magnus Knut Adlercreutz (1825–1890), Finnish vice circuit judge
Herman Adlercreutz (1862–1921), Finnish vice circuit judge
Erik Adlercreutz (1899–1989), Finnish doctor
Herman Adlercreutz (1932–2014), Finnish doctor

Others
Eric Adlercreutz (born 1935), Finnish architect, married to the architect Gunnel Adlercreutz née af Björkesten (born 1941)
Maria Adlercreutz (1936–2014), artist

Notes

Swedish noble families